Nagaon is a Lok Sabha constituency in Assam.

Assembly segments 
Nagaon Lok Sabha constituency is  composed of the following assembly segments:

Members of Parliament

Election Results

General elections 2019

General elections 2014

General elections 2009

See also
 Nowgong
 List of Constituencies of the Lok Sabha

References

External links
Nawgong lok sabha  constituency election 2019 date and schedule

Lok Sabha constituencies in Assam